ZaSu Pitts (January 3, 1894 – June 7, 1963) was an American actress who starred in many silent dramas, including Erich von Stroheim's epic 1924 silent film Greed, and comedies, transitioning successfully to mostly comedy films with the advent of sound films. She also appeared on numerous radio shows. Her career as an entertainer spanned nearly 50 years, and she was awarded a star on the Hollywood Walk of Fame in 1960.

Her parents named her "ZaSu" as an amalgamation of the two maiden aunts she had been named for.

Early life
ZaSu Pitts was born in Parsons, Kansas, to Rulandus and Nelly (née Shay) Pitts; she was the third of four children. Her father, who had lost a leg while serving in the 76th New York Infantry in the Civil War, had settled the family in Kansas by the time ZaSu was born.

The names of her father's sisters, Eliza and Susan, were purportedly the basis for the name "ZaSu", i.e., to satisfy competing family interests. It has been (incorrectly) spelled as Zazu Pitts in some film credits and news articles. However, when introducing herself on the September 4, 1952 episode of I've Got a Secret, she herself pronounced it as Zay-zoo.

In 1903, when Pitts was nine years old, her family moved to Santa Cruz, California, to seek a warmer climate and better job opportunities. Her childhood home at 208 Lincoln Street still stands. She attended Santa Cruz High School, where she participated in school theatricals.

Career

Pitts made her stage debut in 1914–15 doing school and local community theater in Santa Cruz. Going to Los Angeles in 1916, at the age of 22, she spent many months seeking work as a film extra. Finally, she was discovered for substantive roles in films by screenwriter Frances Marion, who cast Pitts as an orphaned slavey (child of work) in the silent film A Little Princess (1917), starring Pickford.

Pitts's popularity grew following a series of Universal one-reeler comedies, and earned her first feature-length lead in King Vidor's Better Times (1919). The following year she married her first husband, Tom Gallery, with whom she was paired in several films, including Heart of Twenty (1920), Bright Eyes, Patsy (both 1921) and A Daughter of Luxury (1922). 

Pitts enjoyed her greatest fame in the early 1930s, often starring in B movies and comedy short films, teamed with Thelma Todd. She played secondary parts in many films. Her stock persona (a fretful, flustered, worried spinster) made her instantly recognizable and was often imitated in cartoons and other films. She starred in a number of Hal Roach short films and features, often in partnership with Thelma Todd as two trouble-prone working girls. At Universal she co-starred in a series of feature-length comedies with Slim Summerville. Switching between comedy short films and features, by the advent of sound, she became a specialist in comedy roles.

Dramatic potential
ZaSu Pitts had hidden talents as a dramatic actress. She was given the greatest tragic role of her career in Erich von Stroheim's -hour epic Greed (1924). The surprise casting initially shocked Hollywood, but showed that Pitts could draw tears with her doleful demeanor, as well as laughs. Having been extensively edited prior to release — the final theatrical cut ran just over two hours — the movie failed initially at the box office, but has since been restored to over four hours and is considered one of the greatest films ever made. Based on her performance, von Stroheim labeled ZaSu Pitts "the greatest dramatic actress." He also featured her in his films The Honeymoon (1928), The Wedding March (1928), and Walking Down Broadway. Pitts's performance in Walking Down Broadway was dramatic, with her character showing a repressed romantic interest in her girlfriend; the studio reshot these scenes with Pitts, now playing the girl's companion for laughs, and von Stroheim's directorial credit was removed from the film. The film was finally released in 1933, much changed, as Hello, Sister!. 

ZaSu Pitts was so recognizable in comedies that the public didn't take her dramatic efforts seriously. In the classic war drama All Quiet on the Western Front (1930), Pitts was cast as the distraught mother of young soldier Lew Ayres, but at preview screenings her intense performance drew unintentional laughs. Her scenes were refilmed with Beryl Mercer. In 1936 RKO needed a replacement actress for its Hildegarde Withers series of murder mysteries; Edna May Oliver had left the studio and Helen Broderick succeeded Oliver in the role. Pitts was chosen to succeed Broderick. In theory, it was a good idea: Pitts seemed to fit the role of a prim, spinster schoolmistress. However, mystery fans couldn't accept the fluttery Pitts as a brainy sleuth who matched wits with the police, and after her two Withers films the series was abandoned.

Radio and stage
Beginning in the 1930s, Pitts found work in radio. She appeared several times in the earliest Fibber McGee and Molly shows, playing a dizzy dame constantly looking for a husband. When Marian Jordan temporarily withdrew from Fibber McGee and Molly due to illness, Pitts made guest appearances opposite Jim Jordan as Fibber. Pitts also guested on variety shows, trading banter with Bing Crosby, Al Jolson, W.C. Fields, and Rudy Vallee, among others. She played Miss Mamie Wayne in the soap opera Big Sister., and was heard as Miss Pitts on The New Lum and Abner Show. 

In 1944, Pitts tackled Broadway, making her debut in the mystery Ramshackle Inn. The play, written expressly for her, did well, and she took the show on the road in later years. She was also a familiar attraction in summer-stock theaters, playing annually in the Norma Mitchell play Post Road.

Postwar movies and television
Postwar films continued to give her the chance to play comic snoops and flighty relatives in such fare as Life with Father (1947), but in the 1950s, she started focusing on television. This culminated in her best-known series role, playing second banana to Gale Storm in CBS's The Gale Storm Show (1956) (also known as Oh, Susanna), in the role of Elvira Nugent ("Nugie"), the shipboard beautician. In 1961, Pitts was cast opposite Earle Hodgins in the episode "Lonesome's Gal" of the ABC sitcom Guestward, Ho!, set on a dude ranch in New Mexico. In 1962, she appeared in an episode of CBS's Perry Mason, "The Case of the Absent Artist". Her final role was as Gertie, the switchboard operator in the Stanley Kramer comedy epic It's a Mad, Mad, Mad, Mad World (1963).

Personal life

Pitts was married to actor Thomas Sarsfield Gallery from 1920 until their 1933 divorce. Gallery became a Los Angeles boxing promoter and later a TV executive. The couple had two children:
ZaSu Ann Gallery
Donald Michael "Sonny" Gallery (born Marvin Carville La Marr), whom they adopted and renamed after the 1926 death of Donald's biological mother (and Pitts's friend), actress Barbara La Marr.

In 1933, Pitts married John Edward "Eddie" Woodall, with whom she remained until her death. 

Declining health dominated Pitts's later years, particularly after she was diagnosed with cancer in the mid-1950s. She continued to work, appearing on TV and making brief appearances in The Thrill of It All (1963) and It's a Mad, Mad, Mad, Mad World. She died in Hollywood on June 7, 1963, aged 69, and was interred at Holy Cross Cemetery, Culver City. Pitts wrote a book of candy recipes, Candy Hits by ZaSu Pitts, which was published posthumously in 1963.

Legacy

ZaSu Pitts was inducted to the Hollywood Walk of Fame on February 8, 1960, for her contribution to motion pictures. Her star is on the south side of the 6500 block of Hollywood Boulevard.

In 1994, she was honored with her image on a United States postage stamp along with fellow actors Rudolph Valentino, Clara Bow and Charlie Chaplin as part of The Silent Screen Stars stamp set, designed by caricaturist Al Hirschfeld. Her birthplace of Parsons, Kansas, has a star tile at the entrance to the Parsons Theatre to commemorate her.

In the film Never Give a Sucker an Even Break (1941), W.C. Fields asks his niece, played by Gloria Jean, "Don't you want to go to school? You want to grow up and be dumb like ZaSu Pitts?" Gloria Jean replied "She only acts like that in pictures. I like her."

Actress Mae Questel, who performed character voices in Max Fleischer's Popeye and Betty Boop cartoons, reportedly based the fluttering utterances of Olive Oyl on Pitts.

Filmography

Television credits

See also
 Pitts and Todd

Notes

References

Sources

External links

 
 
 
 Photographs and literature
 

1894 births
1963 deaths
20th-century American actresses
American anti-communists
Actresses from Kansas
Actresses from Santa Cruz, California
Catholics from California
Catholics from Kansas
American film actresses
American silent film actresses
American stage actresses
American television actresses
American voice actresses
Burials at Holy Cross Cemetery, Culver City
California Republicans
John Birch Society members
Deaths from cancer in California
Hal Roach Studios actors
Kansas Republicans
People from Parsons, Kansas
Universal Pictures contract players
Vaudeville performers
Writers from California
Writers from Kansas
Santa Cruz High School alumni